Elizabeth M. Ryan (January 4, 1923 – May 1998) was an American competition swimmer who represented the United States at the 1936 Summer Olympics in Berlin, Germany.  As a 13-year-old, Ryan swam for the third-place U.S. team in the preliminary heats of the women's 4×100-meter freestyle relay, helping the Americans qualify for the event final.  Under the 1936 Olympic swimming rules, she did not receive a medal because she did not swim in the final.

External links
 

1923 births
1998 deaths
American female freestyle swimmers
Olympic swimmers of the United States
Sportspeople from New York City
Swimmers at the 1936 Summer Olympics
20th-century American women
20th-century American people